Year 1313 (MCCCXIII) was a common year starting on Monday (link will display the full calendar) of the Julian calendar.

Events 
 By place 

 Europe 
 August 8 – Emperor Henry VII begins a campaign against Robert of Naples (the Wise), king of Naples. Henry's allies are loath to join him and his army (some 15,000 man) is supported by 4,000 knights, while the imperial fleet is prepared to attack Robert's realm directly. Henry besieges the city of Siena, but within a week, he succumbs to malaria and dies at Buonconvento on August 24. After the death of Henry, his 17-year-old son John of Bohemia succeeds him, who becomes one of the seven prince-electors of the Holy Roman Empire.
 November 9 – Battle of Gammelsdorf: German forces led by Louis IV (the Bavarian) defeat his cousin Frederick I (the Fair) at Gammelsdorf, who is supported by Leopold I (the Glorious). During the battle, Louis' smaller force does not pursue Frederick's defeated army. He is forced to renounce his tutelage over the young dukes of Lower Bavaria (Henry XIV, Otto IV and Henry XV). The conflict causes a stir within the Holy Roman Empire.
 November 18 – Queen Constance of Portugal, mother of the 2-year-old King Alfonso XI (the Avenger), dies. Alfonso's grandmother Queen dowager María de Molina, his uncle Peter of Castile, and his great-uncle John of Castile divide the regency over the young Alfonso. While Maria takes charge of his education, the infantes, especially Peter, assume the duty of defending Castile.

 England 
 June – Scottish forces led by Edward Bruce besiege Stirling Castle, which is held by an English garrison under Philip Mowbray. Shortly after, Mowbray proposes a bargain: if the English army has not reached the castle by midsummer in 1314, he will surrender the castle to the Scots. Bruce agrees to this and lets Mowbray leave the castle to inform King Edward II of the agreement.
 October – King Robert I (the Bruce)  calls upon a meeting of the Scottish nobles at an assembly in Dundee. There, he gives the Scots who have not yet come into his peace agreement a year to swear fealty to him or lose all their estates. The Scottish nobles of Lothian appeal to Edward II for protection, who promises to bring an English expeditionary force by midsummer in 1314.

 Asia 
 Tran Anh Tong, emperor of Annam (Northern Vietnam), occupies Champa (Southern Vietnam) and establishes the Cham royal dynasty as puppet rulers.

 By topic 

 Literature 
 Wang Zhen, Chinese agronomist, government official and inventor of wooden-based movable type printing, publishes the Nong Shu ("Book of Agriculture"). 

 Religion 
 June 13 – Pope Clement V declares Naples to be under papal protection. He names Robert of Naples (the Wise), "Senator of Rome". 
 King Stefan Milutin, one of the most powerful rulers of Serbia, founds the Banjska Monastery (approximate date).

Births 
 February 9 – Maria of Portugal, queen consort of Castile (d. 1357)
 February 14 – Thomas Beauchamp, English nobleman (d. 1369)
 April 17 – Constantine III (or V), king of Cilician Armenia (d. 1362)
 June 16 – Giovanni Boccaccio, Italian poet and writer (d. 1375)
 July 20 – John Tiptoft, English nobleman and chancellor (d. 1367)
 August 1 – Kōgon, emperor of Japan  (Northern Court) (d. 1364)
 November 16 – Ibn al-Khatib, Arab polymath and writer (d. 1374)
 date unknown
 Bartolus de Saxoferrato, Italian professor and jurist (d. 1357)
 Blanche of France, French princess (House of Capet) (d. 1358)
 Cola di Rienzo, Italian ruler (de facto) and politician (d. 1354) 
 Guy of Boulogne, French archbishop and diplomat (d. 1373)

Deaths 
 February 28 – John Hastings, English nobleman, knight and peer (b. 1262)
 April 13 – Guillaume de Nogaret, French statesman and councillor (b. 1260)
 April 20 – Bolesław II, Polish nobleman, prince and co-ruler (House of Piast)
 May 11 – Robert Winchelsey, English archbishop and theologian (b. 1245)
 May 14 – Bolko I, Polish nobleman and co-ruler (House of Piast) (b. 1258)
 June 18 – John de Burgh (or Burke), Irish nobleman and knight (b. 1286)
 July 24 – Ralph Baldock (or Baldoc), English bishop and Lord Chancellor
 July 27 – Bernhard of Prambach (or Wernhard), German bishop (b. 1220)
 August 10 – Guido de Baysio, Italian canonist, professor, jurist and writer
 August 24 – Henry VII (of Luxembourg), Holy Roman Emperor (b. 1273)
 September 8 – Rupen of Montfort, Cypriot nobleman (House of Montfort)
 September 13 – Notburga of Eben, Austrian peasant and saint (b. 1265)
 September 24 – Philip Despenser, English nobleman and knight (b. 1290)
 September 29 – Imagina of Limburg, queen consort of Germany (b. 1255)
 October 28 – Elisabeth of Carinthia, queen consort of Germany (b. 1262)
 November 18 – Constance of Portugal, queen consort of Castile (b. 1290)
 November 26 – Thomas de Multon, English nobleman and knight (b. 1276)
 date unknown
 Baldwin of Ibelin, Cypriot nobleman and knight (House of Ibelin)
 Baybars al-Ala'i, Mamluk nobleman and governor (House of Bahri)
 Bolad (or Chingsang), Mongol minister, diplomat and chancellor
 Gonsalvus of Spain, Spanish priest, theologian and philosopher
 Martim Afonso Chichorro, Portuguese nobleman and knight (b. 1250)
 Rudolf I, German nobleman, knight and co-ruler (House of Zähringen)
 Simon of Clermont, French nobleman and bishop (House of Clermont)
 Takatsukasa Mototada, Japanese nobleman (Fujiwara Clan) (b. 1247)
 Tekle Haymanot (the Righteous), Ethiopian monk and hermit (b. 1215)
 Walter de Huntercombe, English nobleman and governor (b. 1247)
 Walter de Thornbury, Irish cleric, statesman and Lord Chancellor

References